Prince Frederick Charles of Schwarzburg-Rudolstadt (7 June 1736 – 13 April 1793) was a German Natural History collector, and from 1790 until his death the reigning Prince of Schwarzburg-Rudolstadt.

Life 
Frederick Charles of Schwarzburg-Rudolstadt was born in Rudolstadt, the son of Prince Louis Günther II of Schwarzburg-Rudolstadt and his wife Sophie Henriette, born Countess Reuss of Untergreiz (1711–1771).  As a child, he began his natural history collection, which later went to the Natural History Museum of Rudolstadt.  In 1757, he created the Princely Natural History Collection at the Ludwigsburg Castle in Rudolstadt.  The collection was later enlarged, and in the 19th century, it occupied seven rooms in the castle.  One of the first supervisors of the collection was Christoph Ludwig Kämmerer.  In 1919, the collection was moved to Heidecksburg Castle.

Frederick Charles of Schwarzburg-Rudolstadt corresponded with Johann Heinrich Merck, among others, and let him have some rhinoceros bones and other pieces from his collection for research.  Frederick Charles also corresponded with Johann August Ephraim Goeze (1731–1793), with the physician Friedrich Martini, with the vicar Johann Samuel Schröter (1735–1808) and with Johann Ernst Immanuel Walch (1725–1778).  He had personal and scientific relationships with his correspondents and kept their writings in the library of his Cabinet.  Some of these writings were dedicated to him, for example the third volume of Martini's conchology text, published in 1777, was dedicated to His Princely Highness, the Crown Prince Frederick Charles of Schwarzburg-Rudolstadt, dedicated by his humble subject, the author.  The second edition of Jacob Theodor Klein's Naturalis Dispositio; Echinodermatum was edited and revised by Nathaniel Gottfried Leske and was also dedicated to Frederick Charles.

In 1792, Frederick Charles built a theatre on the green in Rudolstadt.  It was inaugurated a few weeks after his death.  Johann Wolfgang von Goethe was its director from 1793 to 1803.  It later evolved to form the Thuringia State Theatre in Rudolstadt.

Marriage and issue 

Frederick Charles married his first wife, Princess Friederike Sophie Auguste of Schwarzburg-Rudolstadt (1745–1778), in 1763.  They had six children:
 Frederika (1765–1767)
 Louis Frederick II (1767–1807), Prince of Schwarzburg-Rudolstadt
 Henrietta (1770–1783)
 Charles Günther (1771–1825), married Louise Ulrike of Hesse-Homburg, daughter of Landgrave Frederick V; their daughter Karoline married Prince George Bernhard of Anhalt-Dessau
 Caroline (1774–1854), married Prince Günther Frederick Charles I of Schwarzburg-Sondershausen
 Louise (1775–1808), married Landgrave Ernest Constantine of Hesse-Philippsthal

In 1780, Frederick Charles married his second wife, Princess Louise Friederike Auguste (1752–1805), the daughter of Prince John August of Saxe-Gotha-Altenburg.  This marriage was childless.

Ancestry

References 
 Rudolf Möller, Friedrich Carl von Schwarzburg-Rudolstadt (1736-1790-1793). Beiträge zur Biographie des Gründers des Naturhistorischen Museums zu Rudolstadt, in: Rudolstädter naturhistorische Schriften 4, 1992, p. 5-11

Footnotes 

House of Schwarzburg
Princes of Schwarzburg-Rudolstadt
Collectors
1736 births
1793 deaths
18th-century German people